The 2016 basketball tournaments of the National Collegiate Athletic Association (Philippines), otherwise known as NCAA Season 92, officially opened on June 25, 2016 at the Mall of Asia Arena, Pasay. The showdown between season hosts San Beda Red Lions and season 91 men's basketball champions Letran Knights will be the first game, while JRU Heavy Bombers will face Mapua Cardinals in the second game.

The games of the seniors basketball will be played on Tuesdays, Thursdays and Fridays, while the junior games will be conducted every Mondays, Thursdays and Fridays. Most of the basketball games will be held at the Filoil Flying V Centre in San Juan, while Playoffs Final Four and Finals matches will be held at the MOA Arena.

Starting this season, NCAA players can choose their jersey number from #00 to #99. The new rule is in line with the current rules set by FIBA on basketball jerseys. Also, the league will implement harsher penalties against teams who will commit foul away from the ball in the last two minutes or the so-called Hack-a-Shaq fouls.

Veteran basketball analyst Andy Jao will serve as the commissioner of the men's basketball tournament. Jao will tap referees and game officials from the three basketball referees associations, which are all associated with the Samahang Basketball ng Pilipinas (SBP), to officiate this season's basketball games.

Seniors' tournament

Teams

Seniors' coaching changes 
Letran Knights: NU Bullpups head coach Jeff Napa was appointed as the new head coach of the Knights' men's basketball team, taking over from Aldin Ayo who was named as head coach of DLSU Green Archers.
Perpetual Help Altas: Jimwell Gican, who was coaching the team in Season 87, was reappointed as coach of the Altas' men's basketball team. Initially, the team was supposed to be handled by three coaches, Antonio Tamayo, Barry Tobias and Nic Omorogbe but they decided to appoint Gican instead as head coach.
San Sebastian Stags: Former CEU Scorpions head coach Egay Macaraya was appointed as the new head coach of the Stags' men's basketball team, replacing Rodney Santos.

Elimination round

Team standings

Match-up results

Scores

First-seed playoff
Winner will face Perpetual Help, while loser will face Mapua, in the semifinals. Either way, both teams had twice-to-beat advantage in the semifinals.

Bracket

Semifinals
San Beda and Arellano have the twice-to-beat advantage; they only need to win once, while their opponents twice, to advance to the Finals.

San Beda vs. Perpetual

Arellano vs. Mapua

Finals
This is a best-of-three playoff.

Finals Most Valuable Player:

All-Star Game 
The All-Star festivities of the NCAA Season 92 was held at the Filoil Flying V Centre on August 12, 2016, which served as a transition event for the first and second rounds of elimination of the basketball tournament. This also marked the introduction of two new side events, Skills Challenge and Shooting Stars, aside from the three-point shootout and slam dunk competitions.

In the All-Star Game, the 10 member schools were divided into East and West. The West squad is represented by players from San Beda College, University of Perpetual Help, Arellano University, Jose Rizal University and San Sebastian College-Recoletos, while the East team draws from Lyceum of the Philippines University, Emilio Aguinaldo College, College of Saint Benilde, Mapua Institute of Technology, and Colegio de San Juan de Letran.

All-Star Game MVP: Bright Akhuetie (UPHSD)

Side events winners
Skills Challenge Champion: Shane Menina (Mapúa)
Shooting Stars Champion: Darius Estrella, Cadell Buño, and Marvin Hayes (JRU) 
3-Point Shootout Champion: AC Soberano (San Beda) 
Slam Dunk Champion: Yankie Haruna (Benilde)

Awards

Most Valuable Player: 
 Rookie of the Year:  
 Defensive Player of the Year: 
 Most Improved Player: 
 Mythical Five:

Players of the Week

Juniors' tournament

Elimination round

Team standings

Match-up results

Scores

Third-seed playoff

Bracket

Semifinals
San Beda and Malayan have the twice-to-beat advantage; they only need to win once, while their opponents twice, to advance to the Finals.

San Beda vs. Arellano

Malayan vs. LSGH

Finals
This is a best-of-three playoff.

Finals Most Valuable Player:

Awards 

Most Valuable Player: 
 Rookie of the Year: 
 Defensive Player of the Year: 
 Most Improved Player: 
 Mythical Five:

Players of the Week

See also 
 UAAP Season 79 basketball tournaments

References

External links
Official website

90
2016–17 in Philippine college basketball